Maria Amelia Dziewulska (1 June 190918 April 2006) was a Polish composer, music theoretician and music educator. She was born in Warsaw and studied music theory at the State Conservatoire in Warsaw from 1928 to 1933 with Kazimierz Sikorski. She studied special effects for radio, film and recording in London and worked as a music arranger for the BBC and Decca from 1936 to 1937. She then took a position as professor of Music Theory at the Academy of Music in Warsaw, later becoming dean. She died in Warsaw in 2006.

Works
Dziewulska composed in traditional style. Selected works include:
Ave Maria
Inwencje
String Quartet
Folk songs arranged for children's chorus
Duetti per Flauti (1970)

She published material for music study including:
Everything for Mixed Choir
Materials for Aural Training
Inventions (1959)

References

1909 births
2006 deaths
20th-century classical composers
Polish music educators
Women classical composers
Polish composers
Women music educators
20th-century women composers
Polish women composers